Usofila pacifica is a species of true spider in the family Telemidae. It is found in the United States and Canada.

References

Telemidae
Articles created by Qbugbot
Spiders described in 1894